The William Prentiss House is a historic Greek Revival style house in Arlington, Massachusetts.  Built c. 1860, it is one of the oldest houses in the Arlington Heights neighborhood of the town.  It is 2 and a half stories in height, with a side gable roof that has a large shed-roof dormer.  A 20th-century porch extends to the left side, and the centered entrance is sheltered by a modern glassy shallow vestibule.  Stylistically, the house resembles a number of houses built in East Arlington around the same time, but is the only one of its type in this neighborhood.  William Prentiss, a local farmer, was its first known owner.  The house was listed on the National Register of Historic Places in 1985.

See also
 National Register of Historic Places listings in Arlington, Massachusetts
 National Register of Historic Places listings in Middlesex County, Massachusetts

References

Houses on the National Register of Historic Places in Arlington, Massachusetts
Houses in Arlington, Massachusetts